Madkihonnihalli is a village in Dharwad district of Karnataka, India.

Demographics 
As of the 2011 Census of India there were 429 households in Madkihonnihalli and a total population of 1,993 consisting of 1,013 males and 980 females. There were 271 children ages 0-6.

References

Villages in Dharwad district